USS Hyac (SP-216) was a United States Navy patrol vessel in commission from 1917 to 1918.

 Hyac was built as a civilian motorboat of the same name in 1915 by the Weckler Boat Company at Chicago, Illinois. The U.S. Navy acquired her from her owner, W. M. Derby of Chicago, in 1917 for World War I service as a patrol vessel. She was commissioned as USS Hyac (SP-216) on 5 July 1917.

Based at Chicago and assigned to the "9th, 10th, and 11th Naval Districts"—at the time a single administrative entity made up of the 9th Naval District, 10th Naval District, and 11th Naval District -- Hyac served as a patrol boat on the Great Lakes between Chicago and Sault Ste. Marie, Michigan, during World War I.

Following the end of the war, Hyac was returned to her owner on 26 November 1918.

References

Department of the Navy: Navy History and Heritage Command: Online Library of Selected Images: U.S. Navy Ships: USS Hyac (SP-216), 1917-1918.
NavSource Online: Section Patrol Craft Photo Archive: Hyac (SP 216)

Patrol vessels of the United States Navy
World War I patrol vessels of the United States
Ships built in Chicago
1915 ships
Great Lakes ships